Francisca Nuñez de Carabajal (ca. 1540, Portugal – December 8, 1596, Mexico City) was a Marrana (Crypto-Jew) in New Spain executed by burning at the stake by the Inquisition for judaizing in 1596.

Arrival in Mexico
Around 1580 Don Luis de Carabajal, Spanish governor of Nuevo León, brought with him to Mexico his brother-in-law, Don Francisco Rodríguez de Matos, and his sister, Doña Francisca Nuñez de Carabajal, with eight of their nine children, Doña Isabel, the oldest, 25 years of age, widow of Gabriel de Herrera; Doña Catalina, Doña Mariana, Doña Leonor, Don Baltasar, Don Luis, Miguel and Anica (the last two being very young). Another son, Gaspar, a pious young man, perhaps a monk, in the convent of Santo Domingo, Mexico, had arrived a short time before. Doña Catalina and Doña Leonor married respectively Antonio Diaz de Caceres (see Caceres family) and Jorge de Almeida—two Spanish merchants residing in Mexico City and interested in the Taxco mines. The entire family then removed to the capital, where, in the year 1590, while in the midst of prosperity, and seemingly leading Christian lives, they were seized by the Inquisition.

Auto-da-fé

The eldest, Doña Isabel, was tortured until she implicated the whole of the Carabajal family. The whole family was forced to confess and abjure at a public auto-de-fé, celebrated on Saturday, February 24, 1590. Francisca was the only one tortured, taking five rounds on the string rack.

Luis de Carabajal the younger, with his mother and four sisters, was condemned to perpetual imprisonment, and his brother, Baltasar, who had fled upon the first warning of danger, was, along with his deceased father Francisco Rodriguez de Matos, burnt in effigy. In January, 1595, Doña Francisca and her children were accused of a relapse into Judaism and convicted.

Relapse
During their imprisonment they were able to communicate with one another with Spanish pear seeds, on which they wrote touching messages of encouragement to remain true to their faith. They were found out and at the resulting auto-da-fé, Doña Francisca and her children, Isabel, Catalina, Leonor, and Luis, were burned at the stake, together with Manuel Díaz, Beatriz Enríquez, Diego Enríquez, and Manuel de Lucena, being accused of relapsos, term used to those repeatedly accused of judaizing. Of her other children, Doña Mariana, who lost her reason for a time, was tried and put to death at an auto-da-fé held in Mexico City on March 25, 1601; Anica, the youngest child, being reconciled at the same time.

References

Sources

Vicente Riva Palacio, El Libro Rojo, Mexico, 1870.
C.K. Landis, Carabajal the Jew, a Legend of Monterey, Vineland, N. J., 1894.

1596 deaths
Mexican Sephardi Jews
Executed Portuguese people
People executed by the Spanish Inquisition
Conversos
Year of birth uncertain
Executed Mexican people
People executed by Spain by burning
Victims of antisemitic violence
Mexican people of Portuguese-Jewish descent
People executed for heresy
16th-century Mexican women